Joseph Maddison could refer to: 

Joseph Maddison (1850–1923), New Zealand architect
Joseph Maddison (trade unionist) (born 1838), British iron worker

See also
Joe Madison, American radio host